David Ditlaishego Dube (born 14 October 1960 in Lydenburg) is a South African politician and the author of Al Capone of Mpumalanga. Dube deputised for David Mabuza while Mabuza served as provincial chairperson of the African National Congress in Mpumalanga

Early life

Dube was born in Lydenburg (now called Mashishing) on 14 October 1960. He matriculated at Burgersfort's Leolo High School in 1982 before obtaining a Diploma in Teaching from Mgwenya College in 1985 and was subsequently employed as a teacher at Kgahlanong High School where he taught history, Afrikaans and Business Economics.

Education and Career

Dube is a politician for South Africa's African National Congress since 1988 and served in various roles in regional positions before he was elected the party's deputy chairperson along with David Mabuza who became chairperson at that December 2012 elective congress.

Dube was one of the executives of the provincial Human Settlements Department that included Peter Nyoni and Bongani Bongo who David Mabuza refused to renew their contracts in 2013. Mabuza who was Premier of Mpumalanga then said the reason for not renewing the contracts was because the three focused too much on politics and failed to deliver services to the poor

He served as member of the Mpumalanga legislature, legislature deputy speaker and head of the Mpumalanga department of human settlement.

He was one of the politicians nominated by ANC branches to contest Mabuza for ppst of provincial chair at a 2015 provincial congress but lost when Mabuza emerged unopposed. He threw the hat in the ring again in 2022 but didn't receive enough votes to stand for nomination, leading to the conference to be a two-way race between Mandla Ndlovu and Lucky Ndinisa. Ndlovu won the conference

Dube holds a PhD in Public Administration from the University of Fort Hare. Others of his qualifications include a master's degree in Public Administration from the University of Pretoria (2005), BA honours (education) from Nelson Mandela Bay University (2002), Tech Degree in Education Management as well as other qualifications in local government, project management, training and co-councillor training

References

External links
People's Assembly
Critical assessment of the human resource capacity needs of senior management at Thaba Chweu Municipality in Mpumalanga Province, South Africa by David Dube

1960 births
Living people